Thomas James Wiley (April 28, 1950 – December 26, 2021) was a Canadian professional ice hockey center and coach. He played 62 games in the National Hockey League (NHL) between 1972 and 1977, split between the Pittsburgh Penguins and Vancouver Canucks, with the bulk of his career being spent in the minor Central Hockey League. Wiley retired as a player in 1980, and in 1984 became a coach in the United States Hockey League, and later coached in several minor leagues. In 1995–96 Wiley coached the NHL's San Jose Sharks for the final 57 games of the season, before returning to the minors. His last season as a coach was in 2008.

Playing career

Born in Sault Ste. Marie, Ontario, Wiley signed as a free agent with the Pittsburgh Penguins in 1972 following a fine collegiate career at Lake Superior State University, becoming the first Lakers alum to play in the NHL. He spent the majority of the next two seasons with the Hershey Bears, Pittsburgh's American Hockey League (AHL) affiliate, although he did appear in 26 games for the Penguins over that stretch, recording four assists.

Wiley was selected by the Vancouver Canucks in the 1974 intra-league draft, but continued to find himself toiling in minor pro. He earned a two-game callup in 1975–76, and had his longest NHL stint in 1976–77, when he recorded four goals and ten points in 34 games for the Canucks. He retired in 1980 without seeing any further NHL action.

Wiley appeared in 62 NHL games, recording four goals and ten assists for 14 points along with eight penalty minutes.

Coaching career

Following his retirement, Wiley moved into coaching. He was the long-time coach of the Des Moines Buccaneers of the United States Hockey League before breaking into the pro ranks in 1993 as head coach of the Kansas City Blades, the top affiliate of the San Jose Sharks.

When the Sharks fired head coach Kevin Constantine after a dismal 3–18–4 start, Wiley was promoted to the head coaching position with the NHL club. While his 17–37–3 record was somewhat of an improvement over their start, it was not enough for Wiley to keep his job. Following the season, he was reassigned back to the Sharks' top farm team, then the Kentucky Thoroughblades, where he served until 1998.

After leaving the Sharks organization, Wiley made stops in the East Coast Hockey League, Central Hockey League, and United Hockey League.

Personal life and death
Wiley died on December 26, 2021, at the age of 71.

Career statistics

Regular season and playoffs

Coaching

NHL

Other leagues

References

External links

1950 births
2021 deaths
Canadian ice hockey centres
Canadian ice hockey coaches
Hershey Bears players
Ice hockey people from Ontario
Lake Superior State Lakers men's ice hockey players
Pittsburgh Penguins players
San Jose Sharks coaches
Sault Ste. Marie Greyhounds players
Seattle Totems (CHL) players
Sportspeople from Sault Ste. Marie, Ontario
Tulsa Oilers (1964–1984) players
Undrafted National Hockey League players
Vancouver Canucks players